This is a list of Romanian football transfers for the winter 2011–12 transfer window. Only moves featuring at least one Liga I club are listed.

Transfers

Notes and references

Romania
2011-12
Transfers